Bascuñana de San Pedro is a municipality located in the province of Cuenca, Castile-La Mancha, Spain. It has a population of 21 (2014).

Municipalities in the Province of Cuenca